Ian McKee (born 1940) is an English-born Scottish National Party politician. He was a Member of the Scottish Parliament (MSP) for the Lothians region from 2007 to 2011.

Early life
Born in South Shields, England, McKee was educated at Fettes College in Edinburgh and at the University of Edinburgh. He then became a hospital doctor in the National Health Service, before becoming a Medical Officer in the Royal Air Force (RAF) from 1966 to 1971. He worked as a general practitioner in a medical practice in Wester Hailes, Edinburgh. He formerly wrote a column in The Scotsman newspaper.

Political career
McKee was elected during the 2007 election for the Lothians region.

In 2010, at the age of 70, he announced that he would not be standing for re-election.

References

External links 
 

1940 births
Living people
British general practitioners
People from South Shields
Politicians from Tyne and Wear
Alumni of the University of Edinburgh
People educated at Fettes College
Royal Air Force Medical Service officers
Scottish National Party MSPs
Members of the Scottish Parliament 2007–2011